Brian Thomas Oliver (26 September 1929 – 20 October 2015) was an Australian Olympic athlete who specialised in the triple jump, long jump and sprint running. He won the triple jump event at the 1950 British Empire Games and placed 23rd at the 1956 Summer Olympics. Oliver won the national triple jump title in 1953–54 and 1956, and the long jump title in 1953 and 1956. He was ranked #3 in the world in 1950 and #4 in 1953 in the triple jump.

References

1929 births
2015 deaths
Australian male long jumpers
Australian male triple jumpers
Olympic athletes of Australia
Athletes (track and field) at the 1956 Summer Olympics
Athletes (track and field) at the 1950 British Empire Games
Athletes (track and field) at the 1954 British Empire and Commonwealth Games
Commonwealth Games gold medallists for Australia
Commonwealth Games bronze medallists for Australia
Commonwealth Games medallists in athletics
People from Northam, Western Australia
Medallists at the 1950 British Empire Games